The AIR Awards of 2010 (or Jägermeister Independent Awards of 2010) is the fifth annual Australian Independent Record Labels Association Music Awards (generally known as the AIR Awards) and was an award ceremony at The Forum Theatre, in Melbourne, Australia on 1 October 2010. The event was again sponsored by German liquor brand, Jägermeister. 

The event was hosted by Scott Dooley for Nova 96.9 and Australian pay-TV music broadcaster Channel V aired the event in October 2010.

For the first time, a category for Most Popular Artist was added to the awards, as voted by Nova 96.9 listeners.

Performers
British India
Cloud Control
Joe Chindamo
M-Phazes
Sally Seltmann
The Amity Affliction

Nominees and winners

AIR Awards
Winners are listed first and highlighted in boldface; other final nominees are listed alphabetically.

AIR Awards (public voted)

See also
Music of Australia

References

2010 in Australian music
2010 music awards
AIR Awards